ŽFK Ekonomist is a women's football club from Nikšić, Montenegro. It plays in the Montenegrin Women's League and is the league's inaugural champion. In 2012, the team became the first women's team from Montenegro to enter the UEFA Women's Champions League. Before the creation of the league, the team won the FSCG Trophy once.

The team was founded in 2007.

Titles
 4 Montenegrin Women's League : 2011–12, 2012–13, 2013–14, 2014–15
 1 FSCG Trophy (Trofej FSCG) : 2011

Record in UEFA competitions

Current squad
 As of 6 May 2020.
 Flags indicate national team as defined under FIFA eligibility rules. Players may hold more than one non-FIFA nationality.''

Former internationals
  Montenegro: Sladjana Bulatović, Jasna Djoković, Darija Đukić, Tatjana Djurković, Armisa Kuć, Jelena Sturanović, Ivona Turčinović, Andreja Vidić

See also
Montenegrin Women's League
Football in Montenegro

References

External links
Team info at Monenegro FA
Football Association of Montenegro 

Women's football clubs in Montenegro
2007 establishments in Montenegro